Howard Lovecraft and the Frozen Kingdom is a 2016 animated film based on the graphic novel of the same name, itself inspired by the writings of American horror author H. P. Lovecraft. Two sequels, Howard Lovecraft and the Undersea Kingdom and Howard Lovecraft and the Kingdom of Madness, were released in 2017 and 2018.

Plot
After visiting his father in Arkham Sanitarium, young Howard Lovecraft accidentally uses the legendary Necronomicon to open a portal to a strange frozen world filled with horrifying creatures and a great adventure.

Cast
 Ron Perlman - Shoggoth
 Christopher Plummer - Dr. West
 Jane Curtin - Algid Bunk
 Doug Bradley - Nyarlathotep
 Scott McNeil - Barry/Govlins
 Alison Wandzura - Mary Lovecraft
 Kiefer O'Reilly - Howard Lovecraft/Davik
 Harmony O'Reilly - Innes
 Michelle O'Reilly - Sarah Lovecraft
 Phoenix O'Reilly - Twi'i
 Sean Patrick O'Reilly - Spot
 Summer O'Reilly - Gotha
 Tyler Nicol - Winfield Lovecraft

Overview
The Howard Lovecraft series is a trilogy of graphic novels written by Bruce Brown and illustrated by Renzo Podesta. that began publishing in 2009 with Howard Lovecraft and The Frozen Kingdom. The sequel Howard Lovecraft & The Undersea Kingdom was published in 2011 and the third volume Howard Lovecraft & The Kingdom of Madness was published in 2013. In 2014, Howard Lovecraft & The Three Kingdoms was released, printing the three series in one hardcover book. The books derived their world and characters from the Cthulhu Mythos created by Lovecraft.

Howard Lovecraft and the Frozen Kingdom is the first screen adaptation of the Howard Lovecraft series. Two sequels, Howard Lovecraft and the Undersea Kingdom and Howard Lovecraft and the Kingdom of Madness, were released in 2017 and 2019.

Production
On March 22, 2016, it was announced that Ron Perlman and Christopher Plummer had been cast in an upcoming animated feature. Shout! Factory has acquired the distribution rights to the film and Howard Lovecraft series.

References

External links

2016 films
2016 computer-animated films
Animated films based on comics
Arcana Studio titles
Canadian animated feature films
Cthulhu Mythos films
English-language Canadian films
Films based on Canadian comics
Films based on works by H. P. Lovecraft
Films directed by Sean Patrick O'Reilly
2010s English-language films
2010s Canadian films